Metallochaperones are a distinct class of molecular chaperone that facilitate intracellular transport of metal ions to metalloenzymes and metalloproteins in cells through protein-protein interactions. The proteins ensure that the correct metal ion is acquired by its corresponding metalloenzyme. Metallochaperones are essential to the proper functioning of cells, playing a vital role in a  large number of biological processes including respiration, photosynthesis, neurotransmission.

Prior to the discovery of metallochaperones in the late 1990s, biologists believed that metal ions freely diffused within cells without the aid of auxiliary proteins.

References 

Transport proteins
Metalloproteins